Cremlingen is a municipality in the district of Wolfenbüttel, Lower Saxony, Germany. It borders Lehre, Königslutter, Sickte, and Braunschweig. Parts of it are adjacent to the Elm hills.

History

From May 8, 1944 until April 12, 1945 a concentration camp was established in the quarter Schandelah. The camp was a subcamp to the Neuengamme concentration camp.

Until its deestablishment in 1974, the municipalities later merged into Cremlingen were part of the district of Braunschweig.

Traffic
The municipality has 2 train stations in the towns of Schandelah and Weddel at the railroad from Braunschweig to Magdeburg; Weddel is also served by trains towards Wolfsburg (Weddel loop).

The Federal Highway 1 crosses the municipality from east to west, and since the end of September 2006 Cremlingen has a connection point to the Federal Motorway (Bundesautobahn 39), which offers quick connections both to Wolfsburg and Braunschweig.

Division of the municipality 
Cremlingen was established in 1974 by merging the former municipalities of
 Abbenrode
 Cremlingen
 Destedt
 Gardessen
 Hemkenrode
 Hordorf
 Klein Schöppenstedt
 Schandelah
 Schulenrode
 Weddel

Notable places 

Cremlingen hosts the Cremlingen transmitter, a major medium wave antenna used for broadcasting Deutschlandfunk.

See also
List of subcamps of Neuengamme
The Permanent Cure

Notes

References
Official German list of concentration camps Verzeichnis der Konzentrationslager und ihrer Außenkommandos

External links 

  

Wolfenbüttel (district)
Neuengamme concentration camp